Symmerista leucitys, the orange-humped mapleworm moth,  is a moth of the family Notodontidae. It is found in North America, from southern Canada and the northern half of the United States east of the Great Plains.

The wingspan is about 35 mm. There is one generation per year.

The larvae feed on Acer species.

References

Moths described in 1946
Notodontidae
Moths of North America